Nong Bua Lamphu Province Stadium is a multi-purpose stadium in Nong Bua Lamphu Province, Thailand.  It is currently used mostly for football matches and is the home stadium of Nongbua Pitchaya F.C.

References

Multi-purpose stadiums in Thailand